Jean Dop (1924–2003) was a French professional rugby league footballer who played in the 1950s. A France international representative , he played club football for Marseille XIII.

Dop featured in the 1951 French rugby league tour of Australia and New Zealand, in place of injured scrum-half back Joseph Crespo. It was Les Chanticleers first such tour, but they lost only 4 of its 28 games, with Dop's dashing runs seen as instrumental in France's victory over Australia in the first Test. Also during this tour in a match against South Auckland in New Zealand Dop was struck by a spectator. In 1988 he was inducted into the International Rugby League Hall of Fame.

References

External links
Jean Dop stats at rugbyleagueproject.com

1924 births
2003 deaths
France national rugby league team players
French rugby league players
Marseille XIII players
Rugby league halfbacks